Reginald Kenneth Thomas (born April 21, 1953) is a Canadian former professional ice hockey player who played primarily in the World Hockey Association (WHA).

Career 
After a standout junior career with the London Knights, in which he scored 309 points in only three seasons, he was drafted by both the Los Angeles Sharks of the WHA and the Chicago Black Hawks of the National Hockey League (NHL). Thomas played seven seasons in the WHA for the Sharks, Michigan Stags, Baltimore Blades, Indianapolis Racers, and Cincinnati Stingers. After the dissolution of the WHA he played 39 NHL games for the Quebec Nordiques in the NHL, and ultimately retired from hockey in 1985 after a spell in Austria for WAT Stadlau. Today, he runs a farm and produce market just outside Lambeth, Ontario.

Personal life 
His son, Reg Thomas, Jr., played hockey as well, for the Sarnia Sting and Sault Ste. Marie Greyhounds. Thomas has another son named Dylan, who was drafted by the Belleville Bulls of the OHL and his youngest son, Blake Thomas also played for the Sarnia Sting.

External links

1953 births
Baltimore Blades players
Canadian ice hockey centres
Chicago Blackhawks draft picks
Cincinnati Stingers players
Cincinnati Tigers players
Ice hockey people from Ontario
Indianapolis Racers players
Living people
London Knights players
Los Angeles Sharks draft picks
Los Angeles Sharks players
Michigan Stags players
Montana Magic players
New Brunswick Hawks players
Nova Scotia Voyageurs players
Sportspeople from London, Ontario
Quebec Nordiques players
St. Catharines Saints players
World Hockey Association first round draft picks